Aujla Khurd (Punjabi: "اوجلہ خورد") is a village situated in Gujranwala District, Punjab province in Pakistan, located at geographical coordinates 32° 20' 20" North, 74° 9' 30" East.Khurd and Kalan Persian language word which means small and big respectively when two villages have same name then it is distinguished as Kalan means big and Khurd means small with Village Name.

Villages in Gujranwala District